The Manege Affair was an episode when Nikita Khrushchev together with other Party leadership visited an anniversary art exhibition "30 Years of the Moscow Artists' Union" at Moscow Manege on December 1, 1962. It resulted in Khruschev's angry rant against "filth, decadence and sexual deviations" he saw along with the traditional works of Socialist Realism. After the visit, he arranged a campaign to tighten the grip of the Party over culture. This has been described as the beginning of the end of the Cultural Thaw in the Soviet Union. The episode is covered in detail in the book Unofficial Art in the Soviet Union by Paul Sjeklocha and Igor Mead and in other publications.

Khrushchev's anger was fueled further when he was informed about a recent KGB takedown on a clandestine group of homosexual intellectuals, who worked for the Iskusstvo (The Art) publishing house. Speaking to Ely Bielutin, the exhibition host, Khrushchev said:
Don't you know how to paint? My grandson will paint it better! What is this? Are you men or damned pederasts!? How can you paint like that? Do you have a conscience?
That's it, Belyutin, I'm telling you as the Chairman of the Council of Ministers: The Soviet people doesn't need all this. I'm telling you! Forbid! Prohibit everything! Stop this mess! I order! I say! And check everything! On the radio, on television, and in print, uproot all sympathizers of this!

See also
 Bulldozer Exhibition

References

Nikita Khrushchev
Soviet art
1962 in the Soviet Union
Art controversies
1962 in art